Enrique 'Bubi' Maier (December 31, 1910 – August 22, 1981) was a male Spanish tennis player who was mainly active in the 1930s.

Biography

Maier became Wimbledon champion in the mixed doubles in 1932 when, partnered with Elizabeth Ryan, they defeated Harry Hopman and Josane Sigart in straight sets. He was the first Spanish male player to win a Wimbledon title. In that same year he also reached the quarterfinals of the singles championship, beating Frenchman Jean Borotra along the way, and losing to eventual champion Ellsworth Vines.

In 1935 he competed in the mixed doubles competition at the U.S. National Championships held at the Longwood Cricket Club (Boston, Massachusetts) together with the American Sarah Palfrey. They won the title by beating the Czechoslovakian-British pair Roderick Menzel / Kay Stammers in three sets.

Maier competed in the Davis Cup for the first time in 1929 against Germany and in total competed in nine ties in which he won and lost 13 matches.

Personal life
He was the son of Otto Maier who played for FC Barcelona, and his wife, Anna Elizabeth Müller.

Grand Slam finals

Mixed doubles (2 titles)

References

External links

 
 

1910 births
1981 deaths
Tennis players from Barcelona
Spanish male tennis players
Grand Slam (tennis) champions in mixed doubles
Wimbledon champions (pre-Open Era)
United States National champions (tennis)
Spanish people of German descent